Aleph is the debut album by French DJ Gesaffelstein, released on 28 October 2013 on Parlophone and through OWSLA in North America. Gesaffelstein began recording it in 2011, and while still working on it, he gained popularity as one of the producers behind Kanye West's Yeezus (2013). Two singles were released to promote Aleph: "Pursuit" and "Hate or Glory". The album received positive reviews from music critics.

Promotion and release
Before the release of Aleph, two singles were released to promote the album. The first one, "Pursuit", was released on 17 June 2013. The same day music video for it was also released. Spin named it one of the best music videos of 2013. The second single, "Hate or Glory", was released on 8 October 2013, along with a music video for it.

In September 2013 the album was made available for pre-order. The album packaging was also shown. Similar to Kanye West's Yeezus, physical release features no album cover; the album's gold disc is placed inside an empty CD jewel case covered by thin white lines, resembling a circuit board, with a white Hebrew letter Aleph in the middle of it. Aleph was released on 28 October 2013 on Parlophone and through OWSLA in North America.

Critical reception

Aleph received widespread acclaim from critics. Writing for Pitchfork, Jamieson Cox praised the album and compared it to Kanye West's Yeezus in terms of its "thematic consistency and coherence", while citing the album's lack of concision as its main weakness. Derek Staples of Consequence of Sound noted the album's "steadfast focus on infusing dancefloor chaos with hushed melodies, soul-piercing vocals, and isolated, minimal basslines" and claimed that Gesaffelstein was "fortifying the roots of a very successful career". David Renshaw from NME magazine felt that much of the album had "a stainless-steel coldness to it" which he claimed "mostly works." In Los Angeles Times, August Brown called Aleph Gesaffelstein's breakthrough album and "a harsh reaction to the smoothed-out disco tones that have dominated radio and mainstream clubs of late". Reef Younis in his review for Clash magazine gave the album an 8/10 and wrote, "From the tom-tom thump of opener of ‘Out Of Line’ to the twisted electro of ‘Trans’, the beats hit with a thundering mechanical heft."

Accolades
Spin featured Aleph on their "20 Best Dance Albums of 2013" list, saying that Gesaffelstein "brings all the grinding menace of late-'80s Ministry [...] and creates a texturally naked battering of rusty noises and digital trash". Complex named it one of the best EDM albums of 2013, saying that the album "takes us back to the last electronica era, where major labels were shelling out for albums that pushed the boundaries" and that Gesaffelstein "maintains a vibe that's raw and aggressive, but isn't afraid of going downright murky". Billboard placed the album 14 on its list of 20 best dance music albums of 2013, stating that "Levy’s debut full-length implies an almost refreshing nihilism that rejects the sunshine and light of EDM in a sonic language it still understands".

Track listing

Notes
 The CD version contains a hidden track "Premiere porte" on track 14 "Perfection" which starts at 8:30 approximately. "Perfection" runs for 12 minutes and 17 seconds (12:17) on CD.

Charts

References

External links
 

2013 debut albums
Gesaffelstein albums
Albums produced by Gesaffelstein
Owsla albums